Svislach or Śvislač), or Svisloch, is a river in Grodno Oblast, Belarus, a left tributary of Neman. A stretch of it runs along the Belarus–Poland border.

The source of the river is near the town Svislach, in the South-West of Grodno Region, Belarus. It flows first in west direction, and turns north, following the Polish border, near the village Dublany. Near Ozierany Małe it leaves the border and flows northeast to its confluence with the Neman at the small town Svislach, southeast of Grodno. Some of its tributaries are Odła and Usnarka.

References

Rivers of Grodno Region
Rivers of Poland
Rivers of Podlaskie Voivodeship
Belarus–Poland border
Rivers of Belarus